Mandeep Kaur may refer to:

 Mandeep Kaur (cricketer) (born 1988), Indian cricketer
 Mandeep Kaur (sprinter) (born 1988), Indian sprinter